Ivo Filipe Claudino da Palma Gonçalves (born 6 May 1984) is a Portuguese professional footballer who plays for Länk FC Vilaverdense as a goalkeeper.

Club career
Born in Silves, Algarve, Gonçalves appeared in 232 matches in the Segunda Liga, representing Portimonense SC (two spells), S.C. Farense, Académico de Viseu FC (twice), F.C. Penafiel, Leixões S.C. and F.C. Vizela. He made his debut in the competition on 27 August 2006, in a 0–1 home loss against C.D. Santa Clara.

On 6 December 2015, playing for Penafiel, Gonçalves scored from his goal in an eventual 3–2 defeat away to Santa Clara. He contributed 19 games as Vizela returned to the Primeira Liga at the end of the 2020–21 season after an absence of 36 years, but subsequently played second-fiddle to newly-signed Charles Silva as well as Pedro Silva.

Gonçalves made his first appearance in the top flight in the last match of 2021–22 campaign, with his team already safe from relegation; the 38-year-old started in the 4–1 loss at Moreirense F.C. on 14 May, with the opposition in turn avoiding an immediate drop and being forced to take part in the relegation play-off.

References

External links

1984 births
Living people
People from Silves, Portugal
Sportspeople from Faro District
Portuguese footballers
Association football goalkeepers
Primeira Liga players
Liga Portugal 2 players
Segunda Divisão players
Vitória F.C. players
Portimonense S.C. players
S.C. Farense players
Académico de Viseu F.C. players
F.C. Penafiel players
Leixões S.C. players
F.C. Vizela players
Vilaverdense F.C. players